Elisa Gasparin (born 2 December 1991) is a Swiss biathlete. Gasparin competed at the 2014 Winter Olympics. She was 56th at the 2012–13 Biathlon World Cup.

She is the sister of fellow biathletes Selina Gasparin and Aita Gasparin.

References

External links
 IBU profile

Swiss female biathletes
Biathletes at the 2014 Winter Olympics
Biathletes at the 2018 Winter Olympics 
Olympic biathletes of Switzerland
1991 births
Living people
Sportspeople from Graubünden